Cho Hye-jin (조혜진, born 16 January 1995) is a South Korean field hockey player. She competed for the South Korea women's national field hockey team at the 2016 Summer Olympics.

References

External links

1995 births
Living people
People from Pyeongtaek
South Korean female field hockey players
Field hockey players at the 2016 Summer Olympics
Olympic field hockey players of South Korea
Field hockey players at the 2018 Asian Games
Asian Games competitors for South Korea
Sportspeople from Gyeonggi Province
20th-century South Korean women
21st-century South Korean women